The Izu thrush or Izu Islands thrush (Turdus celaenops) is a bird of the thrush family native to Japan.

Behavior

Feeding
Izu thrushes eat small animals, such as earthworms and insects, and fruits, like cherries or mullberries.

Breeding
The Izu Thrush's breeding season is March to July. During the first half of this season, the male will sing at dawn, but will, during the second half, sing throughout the day. One source described their song as 'kyurrr, chotts' and their call as 'tweet' or 'chat, chat, chat". They build their nests in trees about half a metre from the ground. They use soil to bind the materials, such as grass and moss, together. While the clutch can have as many as five or as few as two eggs, most clutches are of three to four eggs. The eggs are blue with brown spots and are roughly 3cm long. Both parents look after the chicks.

Predation of nests
Since the introduction of weasels, the fledgling rate has significantly decreased.

Description
The Izu thrush is about 23cm long. Their back and tails are black and they have a yellow eye-ring and bill, brown wings, and a rust-red chest. The males have darker plumage than that of the females.

Distribution
The Izu thrush is an endemic bird of Japan. They are mostly found on the Izu Islands that are between Oshima and Aogashima. Some individuals are found on the Ryukyu Islands of Yaku-shima and Tokara. During the winter, a few birds migrate to Honshu and Shikoku.

Conservation
The izu thrush is described as a vulnerable species by the IUCN Red List. There are between 2500 and 9999 thousand mature individuals and the population is decreasing, though it is not severely fragmented. The amount and/or quality of their habitat is decreasing. They are threatened by volcanoes, roads, railroads, wood plantations, tourism areas, and both native and invasive species and diseases.

References

External links
Izu Thrush entry at Avibase

Birds described in 1887
Endemic birds of Japan
Birds of the Ryukyu Islands
Izu Islands
Turdus